Balakun is a Himalayan  peak situated in the Chamoli district of Uttarakhand state of India. Balakun Peak is located 16 km from Badrinath. Balakun is situated north west to Badrinath. Balakun is situated between Bhagirathi Kharak glacier and Satopanth glacier. The peak is situated north east of Nilkanth peak. The two glaciers rise from the eastern slopes of Chaukhamba (7140 m) peak and wrap around the Balakun peak. Balakun is situated north of Kunaling (5471 m) and south of the Arwa Group. The peak was first climbed in 1973 a by six-man team of  ITBP led by Hukum Singh.

Nearby glaciers
Bhagirathi Kharak glacier
Satopanth glacier

Nearby peaks
Nilkantha (6,600 m)
Chaukhamba (7,140 m)
Kunaling (5,471 m)

Mountains of Uttarakhand
Tourist attractions in Uttarakhand
Geography of Chamoli district
Six-thousanders of the Himalayas